Tequilajazzz is a Russian alternative rock band led by bassist Evgeny "Ai-yai-yai" Fedorov based in Saint Petersburg. Band members also included drummer Aleksandr "Dooser" Voronov on the drums, Konstantin Fedorov, and guitarist Oleg Baranov.

The group was known for its energetic live performances, characteristic rhythm section, rather minimalistic yet inventive arrangements, and openness to contact with fans. The group's first album Strelyali? was released in 1995.

Group members cited The Pixies and Sonic Youth, among others, as their influences.

Tequilajazzz officially disbanded in 2010. In 2013, the group reunited and performed anniversary concerts. They recorded an acoustic album, which was released in 2018.

Discography

Studio albums 
 Strelyali? (1993)
 Virus (1996)
 Tselluloid (1998)
 150 Milliardov Shagov (1999)
 Vyshe Oseni (2002)
 Journal Zhivogo (2009)
 NEBYLO (2018)
 Kamni (2021)

Side and solo projects 
Tequilajazzz members are involved in a number of side and solo projects playing in a wide variety of musical styles, including the bands Optimystica Orchestra and S.P.O.R.T. Evgeny Fedorov has also composed music for several Russian motion picture and television series soundtracks. Another noticeable Evgeny's side project is Zorge the band.

References

External links 

 

Musical groups from Saint Petersburg
Russian rock music groups
Russian alternative rock groups